Allison White (December 21, 1816 – April 5, 1886) was a Democratic member of the U.S. House of Representatives from Pennsylvania.

Early life and education
White was born in Pine Township, near Jersey Shore, Pennsylvania.  He attended the public schools and was graduated from Allegheny College in Meadville, Pennsylvania.

He studied law, was admitted to the bar and commenced practice in Lock Haven, Pennsylvania.

Congress
White was elected as a Democrat to the Thirty-fifth Congress.  He served as chairman of the United States House Committee on Expenditures on Public Buildings.  He was an unsuccessful candidate for reelection in 1858.

Later career and death
He engaged in the lumber and coal business at Philadelphia, Pennsylvania, eventually forming a partnership with Charles and Edward Julius Berwind that currently exists as the Berwind Corporation.

White died in Philadelphia in 1886.  He was interred in Highland Cemetery in Lock Haven.

Sources

Allison White in The Political Graveyard

1816 births
1886 deaths
Pennsylvania lawyers
Democratic Party members of the United States House of Representatives from Pennsylvania
Allegheny College alumni
19th-century American politicians
People from Lycoming County, Pennsylvania
19th-century American lawyers